Emma Xuereb (born 5 January 1992) is a Maltese football forward.

International goals

Honours 
Mosta FC
Winner
 Maltese First Division: 2010–11

Runners-up
 Maltese First Division: 2011–12, 2012–13

External links 
 

1992 births
Living people
Maltese women's footballers
Malta women's international footballers
Women's association football forwards